The Grand Opera House is a historic opera house in Ashland, Wisconsin. The building was one of the first theatres in the region, and was originally a vaudeville/opera house/live performance venue.

Built in 1893, it was designed by architect Oscar Cobb. It is located in a spot that was originally surrounded by hotels. The massive two-story brick building was built in the Romanesque Revival Style. The auditorium is located on the second floor, which features graceful arched windows on the front side. The street level contains two storefront spaces with square window designs.

According to the 1893 Ashland Daily Press Annual Edition, the original plan and location for this building were different. Proposed at a corner of Sixth Avenue West and Main Street West, it was built instead at the present location with a smaller and less expensive design. This was likely due to the financial panic of 1893.

Vacant and in need of restoration, the opera house received some redevelopment, including the restoration of the front facade.

The building is a contributing resource within the West Second Street Historic District, of downtown Ashland. Although not located directly on Second Street (later renamed Main Street), it is still considered a contribution to the Historic District, being located close to the District on a side street.

In later years, the building housed a liquor store and a gun shop.

References

External links 
Grand Opera House at Cinematreasures.org

Opera houses
Opera houses in Wisconsin
Event venues established in 1893
Vaudeville theaters
1893 establishments in Wisconsin
Ashland, Wisconsin